AP5 (also known as APV, (2R)-amino-5-phosphonovaleric acid, or (2R)-amino-5-phosphonopentanoate) is a chemical compound used as a biochemical tool to study various cellular processes.  It is a selective NMDA receptor antagonist that competitively inhibits the ligand (glutamate) binding site of NMDA receptors. AP5 blocks NMDA receptors in micromolar concentrations (~50 μM).

AP5 blocks the cellular analog of classical conditioning in the sea slug Aplysia californica, and has similar effects on Aplysia long-term potentiation (LTP), since NMDA receptors are required for both. It is sometimes used in conjunction with the calcium chelator BAPTA to determine whether NMDARs are required for a particular cellular process. AP5/APV has also been used to study NMDAR-dependent LTP in the mammalian hippocampus.

In general, AP5 is very fast-acting within in vitro preparations, and can block NMDA receptor action at a reasonably small concentration. The active isomer of AP5 is considered to be the D configuration, although many preparations are available as a racemic mixture of D- and L-isomers. It is useful to isolate the action of other glutamate receptors in the brain, i.e., AMPA and kainate receptors.

AP5 can block the conversion of a silent synapse to an active one, since this conversion is NMDA receptor-dependent.

See also
AMPA
AP7 (drug)
Kainate

References

External links
 Laube, B; Hirai H, Sturgess M, Betz H, and Kuhse J (1997). "Molecular determinants of antagonists discrimination by NMDA receptor subunits: Analysis of the glutamate binding site on the NR2B subunit". Neuron 18 (3): 493–503. . .

NMDA receptor antagonists
Amino acids
Phosphonic acids